The current mayor of Southaven is Darren Musselwhite.

City Hall is located at 8710 Northwest Drive.

List of mayors

References

External links
Official website of Southaven, Mississippi

Southaven, Mississippi